The Lithuanian national ice hockey team is the national ice hockey team of Lithuania, and a member of the International Ice Hockey Federation. Lithuania is currently in 26th place in the IIHF World Rankings. They have never competed in Olympic Games.

World Championship record
 1938 – Finished in 10th place
 1954–1991 – Part of the Soviet Union national ice hockey team due to Soviet occupation
 1993 – Not ranked (3rd in "Pool C" Qualification Group 1)
 1994 – Not ranked (2nd in "Pool C2" Qualification Group 1)
 1995 – Finished in 31st place (2nd in "Pool C2")
 1996 – Finished in 29th place (1st in "Pool D")
 1997 – Finished in 28th place (8th in "Pool C")
 1998 – Finished in 27th place (3rd in "Pool C")
 1999 – Finished in 27th place (3rd in "Pool C")
 2000 – Finished in 28th place (4th in "Pool C")
 2001 – Finished in 28th place (6th in Division I Group A)
 2002 – Finished in 30th place (1st in Division II Group B)
 2003 – Finished in 28th place (6th in Division I Group A)
 2004 – Finished in 29th place (1st in Division II Group B)
 2005 – Finished in 26th place (5th in Division I Group B)
 2006 – Finished in 19th place (2nd in Division I Group B)
 2007 – Finished in 26th place (5th in Division I Group B)
 2008 – Finished in 24th place (4th in Division I Group B)
 2009 – Finished in 24th place (4th in Division I Group A)
 2010 – Finished in 26th place (5th in Division I Group A)
 2011 – Finished in 25th place (5th in Division I Group B)
 2012 – Finished in 27th place (5th in Division I Group B)
 2013 – Finished in 27th place (5th in Division I Group B)
 2014 – Finished in 25th place (3rd in Division I Group B)
 2015 – Finished in 25th place (3rd in Division I Group B)
 2016 – Finished in 25th place (3rd in Division I Group B)
 2017 – Finished in 25th place (3rd in Division I Group B)
 2018 – Finished in 23rd place (1st in Division I Group B)
 2019 – Finished in 22nd place (6th in Division I Group A)
 2020 – Cancelled due to the COVID-19 pandemic
2021 – Cancelled due to the COVID-19 pandemic
2022 – Finished in 19th place (3rd in Division I Group A)

Team

Notable players
 Mantas Armalis
 Darius Kasparaitis
 Dainius Zubrus
 Nerijus Ališauskas

References

External links

IIHF profile
National Teams of Ice Hockey

Ice hockey in Lithuania
National ice hockey teams in Europe
Ice hockey